Miloš Ivić (born 22 April 1985) is a Serbian football forward who plays for TV Wackersdorf in Futsal-Regionalliga Süd.

External links
 
 

1985 births
Living people
Sportspeople from Jagodina
Association football forwards
Serbian footballers
FK Mladi Obilić players
FK Pobeda players
Serbian expatriate footballers
Serbian expatriate sportspeople in Sweden
Expatriate footballers in Sweden
Serbian expatriate sportspeople in Greece
Expatriate footballers in Greece